DC Studios (formerly known as DC Films) is an American film, television, and animation studio that is a division of Warner Bros., which is a subsidiary of Warner Bros. Discovery (WBD). It is dedicated to the production of films, series, and animations based on characters from DC Comics, among them is their flagship franchise, the DC Extended Universe (DCEU). James Gunn and Peter Safran assumed control of the company, on November 1, 2022.  Previously, Walter Hamada was the president of DC Films from 2018 until his departure in October 2022.

Background

National era 
During DC's National era, the company licensed Superman, Batman and Wonder Woman (and other All-American Comics characters) to Republic Pictures, Paramount Pictures, and Columbia Pictures for advertising serials and shorts. Other comic characters, such as Fawcett Comics' Shazam and Quality Comics' Plastic Man (which ultimately sold to DC), also had a serial short.

Warner Communications era 
After the release of the first feature-length Batman film, Kinney National Company (later Warner Communications) purchased National Comics Publications in 1967 and then Warner Bros.-Seven Arts in 1969. This purchase meant that the comic company's television and theatrical distribution turned over to Warner Bros. However, it would not take effect until the late 1980s (likely due to licensing deals) after the release of the Superman and Swamp Thing films. The Batman films once again marked a return to the big screen.

History

DC Films 
After the divisive reception of Batman v Superman: Dawn of Justice, Warner Bros. Pictures made moves to stabilize the direction of the DC Extended Universe. The studio reorganized in May 2016 to have genre-responsible film executives, thus DC Entertainment franchise films under Warner Bros. were placed under a newly created division, DC Films, created under Warner Bros. executive vice president Jon Berg and DC Comics chief content officer Geoff Johns. This was done in hopes of competing more directly with Marvel Studios' Marvel Cinematic Universe. Johns also kept his existing role at DC Comics. However, the division's formation was not designed to override the "director-driven" mandate.

Justice League had one of the biggest film budgets (nearly $300 million) but grossed about $96 million in its opening weekend. An analysis in The Washington Post expected that there would be a course correction again, with a possible change in leadership. The DC Extended Universe operated under a "director-driven" mandate. Forbes contributors felt that the course correction would be for DC Films to give up on the shared universe, while continuing with the Wonder Woman films and occasionally other films, as Warner Bros. has other franchises they can work with. Despite this, in December the studio reiterated their current film slate for the unofficially titled DC Extended Universe. That same month, Warner Bros. announced that a new strategy and organization of DC Films would occur with Berg leaving his position as studio's co-president of production to form a Warner Bros.-based production company with Roy Lee, the producer of The LEGO Movie and It. In January 2018, Warner Bros. executive Walter Hamada was appointed as new president of DC Films, to oversee the films in the DC Extended Universe. Hamada has been closely associated with New Line Cinema, and helped develop horror films, such as It and The Conjuring film franchises.

Restructuring 
In April 2022, after the merger between WarnerMedia and Discovery, Inc. to form Warner Bros. Discovery, the new CEO David Zaslav was exploring a restructuring of DC Entertainment, including having a creative leader akin to Marvel Studios president Kevin Feige to lead its film and television projects.
Later in July, Toby Emmerich stepped down as the head of the Warner Bros. Motion Picture Group. The group was restructured to give DC Films, Warner Bros. Pictures, New Line Cinema, and Warner Animation Group respective leadership. Former MGM executives Michael De Luca and Pamela Abdy became the co-executives of Warner Bros. Pictures and New Line Cinema. They were also temporarily signed to oversee the remaining units of the group until the new positions were filled.

When the release of the film Batgirl was canceled by Warner Bros. Discovery in August, Hamada was reportedly not consulted regarding the decision and only learned about it when De Luca and Abdy informed him at a test screening for Black Adam (2022). Hamada was upset and considered resigning, but agreed to stay until Black Adam release. Later that month, Dan Lin entered talks to oversee DC's film and television divisions. From this position, Lin was expected to report directly to Zaslav, while Hamada would depart the studio. In September, Lin and Warner Bros. Discovery ended negotiations and agreed to part ways. During Black Adam Times Square premiere in October, star and producer Dwayne Johnson said he could be a consultant at DC Films, helping the studio find its next creative leader. Later that month, it was reported that De Luca had been effectively running DC Films in place of Walter Hamada. On October 19, Hamada departed from the company, just two days before the release of Black Adam.

DC Studios 
Shortly after Hamada left the CEO position, James Gunn and Peter Safran were revealed to serve as the co-CEOs/co-Chairmen of the studio and DC Films was rebranded as "DC Studios". The duo was tasked to oversee production on films, television, and animation under the DC label, reporting directly to David Zaslav, while also working alongside but independently of heads of other divisions. Gunn oversees the creative development on DC projects, while Safran oversees the production side. Their roles began effectively on November 1 the same year. In November, Gunn said that the studio would focus on multiple DCU live-action and animated projects, but also stated that they would acknowledge fan responses and complaints, and confirmed all subsequent DC projects would be released under the DC Studios banner, including those that were filmed prior to the rebranding. In December of the same year, Gunn and Henry Cavill announced that Cavill would no longer return as Superman in any future projects. Gunn also announced that he was writing a new Superman film, based on a younger version of the character. Ben Affleck (who previously portrayed Bruce Wayne/Batman) was also said to be in talks to direct a new DC Studios project. Gunn later revealed that new DC films would have an equal focus on popular and obscure characters, drawing inspiration from the DC animated series Justice League Unlimited and Young Justice.

Gunn and Safran announced the first chapter of their universe titled "Gods and Monsters" on January 31, 2023. They also assembled a writers' room featuring Drew Goddard, Jeremy Slater, Christina Hodson, Christal Henry, and Tom King. Projects that are not a part of the shared universe will be branded as "DC Elseworlds". The following month, Gunn confirmed development for animated films both within the DCU and Elseworlds brands. By March 2023, there had been talks regarding further projects based on comics from DC's Vertigo Comics imprint outside of the upcoming Swamp Thing film.

Management

Current 
 James Gunn: Co-Chairman and Co-Chief Executive Officer (CEO), DC Studios; Gunn serves in leadership as creative head for the company (November 2022–present).
 Peter Safran: Co-Chairman and Co-Chief Executive Officer (CEO), DC Studios; Safran serves in leadership over the business aspects of the company (November 2022–present).
 Chantal Nong: Senior Vice President, Production, overseeing development and production management of DC-based films (February 2018–present).

Former 
 Jon Berg: Former Executive Vice President, Warner Bros. Pictures, former co-Chairman of DC Films, and former co-runner of the DCEU (May 2016–December 2017).
 Geoff Johns: Former Co-Chairman of DC Films (May 2016–December 2017), former President and Chief Creative Officer, DC Entertainment (February 2010–June 2018), and former co-runner of the DCEU (2015–June 2018).
 Walter Hamada: Former President, DC-Based Film Production, Warner Bros. Pictures (January 2018–October 2022).

Production library

Films

Live-action

Animation

Television

Live-action

Animation

Notes

See also 
 DC Entertainment
 List of films based on DC Comics publications
 List of unproduced DC Comics projects
 Marvel Studios

References

External links 
 

DC Studios
2016 establishments in California
American companies established in 2016
Companies based in Burbank, California
DC Entertainment
Warner Bros. divisions
Mass media companies established in 2016
Film production companies of the United States